This is a list of electoral results for the Electoral district of Gascoyne in Western Australian state elections.

Members for Gascoyne

Election results

Elections in the 1980s

Elections in the 1970s

Elections in the 1960s

Elections in the 1950s 

 Preferences were not distributed.
 Gascoyne had been won by the Independent Liberal candidate in the 1951 by-election.

Elections in the 1940s

Elections in the 1930s

Elections in the 1920s

Elections in the 1910s 

 Gilchrist's designation at the 1914 election was simply "Liberal", rather than "National Liberal".

Elections in the 1900s 

 George Hubble, the sitting Ministerialist member, had held the seat unopposed in 1897.

Elections in the 1890s 

 This by-election was called because sitting member George Hubble was declared bankrupt, and the law at the time required that he had to resign his seat. However, he won it unopposed in the resulting by-election.

References

Western Australian state electoral results by district